Malaza fastuosus is a butterfly in the family Hesperiidae. It is found on Madagascar (the west coast, Fito, Rogez Forest).

References

Butterflies described in 1884
Erionotini
Butterflies of Africa
Taxa named by Paul Mabille